Jack Starsmore may refer to:

Jack Starsmore (footballer), an English footballer active in the early 1900s
Jack Starsmore, a fictional character in Marvel Comics and member of Clan Akkaba